Panglima Sugala, officially the Municipality of Panglima Sugala,  is a 3rd class municipality in the province of Tawi-Tawi, Philippines. According to the 2020 census, it has a population of 48,055 people.

It is formerly known as Balimbing.

The municipality's barangay Batu-batu was once the provincial capital of Tawi-Tawi until it was transferred in the municipality of Bongao in 1979.

The municipality was renamed from Balimbing to Panglima Sugala as per Muslim Mindanao Autonomy Act No. 7, enacted on July 4, 1991, and approved by the Regional Governor on September 9, 1991.

Geography

Barangays
Panglima Sugala is politically subdivided into 17 barangays.

Climate

Demographics

Economy

See also
List of renamed cities and municipalities in the Philippines

References

External links

Panglima Sugala Profile at PhilAtlas.com
[ Philippine Standard Geographic Code]
Panglima Sugala Profile at the DTI Cities and Municipalities Competitive Index
Philippine Census Information

Municipalities of Tawi-Tawi
Former provincial capitals of the Philippines